Charles Edward Stuart (May 18, 1850 – April 16, 1889) was a Virginia politician.  He represented Alexandria City and County in the Virginia House of Delegates, and served as that body's Speaker from 1883 until 1887.

References

External links

Members of the Virginia House of Delegates
Speakers of the Virginia House of Delegates
Politicians from Alexandria, Virginia
1850 births
1889 deaths
19th-century American politicians